Mark Wakefield may refer to:
Mark Wakefield (Xero singer), original lead vocalist of American nu metal band Xero, which was later renamed Hybrid Theory and then to Linkin Park.
Mark Wakefield (cricketer) (born 1968), cricketer